Max Thorek (10 March 1880 – 25 January 1960) was a Hungarian-American surgeon, best known for founding the International College of Surgeons in 1935 and writing his autobiography entitled A Surgeon's World in 1943.

Early life and education
Max Thorek was born in Hungary where his father was a physician in a small town. Thorek’s preparation for university training began in Budapest but was interrupted when his younger brother was killed in a pogrom and the family emigrated to Chicago, where he attended the University of Chicago. He completed his medical degree at Rush Medical College in 1904. Thorek later worked in obstetrics, general, and reconstructive surgery.

In 1954, he founded the International Museum of Surgical Science in a Chicago Gold Coast mansion, and was the founder of Thorek Memorial Hospital, as of 2019 still in operation in Chicago's Uptown neighborhood.

He became an internationally acclaimed amateur photographer during the pictorialist movement, and author of several books on the subject, including Camera Art as a Means of Self-Expression (1947) and Creative Camera Art (1937).

Death and legacy
He died in Chicago on 25 January 1960.

References

Further reading
Fellowship of Surgeons: A History of the American College of Surgeons. Loyal Davis

External links 
 

1880 births
1960 deaths
American surgeons
Hungarian surgeons
Austro-Hungarian emigrants to the United States
People from Chicago
20th-century surgeons
University of Chicago alumni
Rush Medical College alumni